The spinyhead cusk (Hastatobythites arafurensis) is a species of viviparous brotula found in the western Pacific Ocean where it occurs from the Arafura Sea to New South Wales, Australia. This species grows to a length of  SL.

References
 

Bythitidae
Monotypic fish genera
Fish described in 1997